Muhamad Safwan Bin Hashim  (born 31 January 1994) is a Malaysian footballer who plays for Felda United as a right back.

References

External links
 

Malaysian footballers
Malaysia international footballers
Malaysia Super League players
Living people
1994 births
Association football defenders
Felda United F.C. players
DRB-Hicom F.C. players
PDRM FA players